Snyder High School may refer to:

Henry Snyder High School in Jersey City, New Jersey
Bishop John J. Snyder High School in Jacksonville, Florida
Snyder High School (Texas) in Snyder, Texas

See also
 Snider High School